= Ternopil Encyclopedic Dictionary =

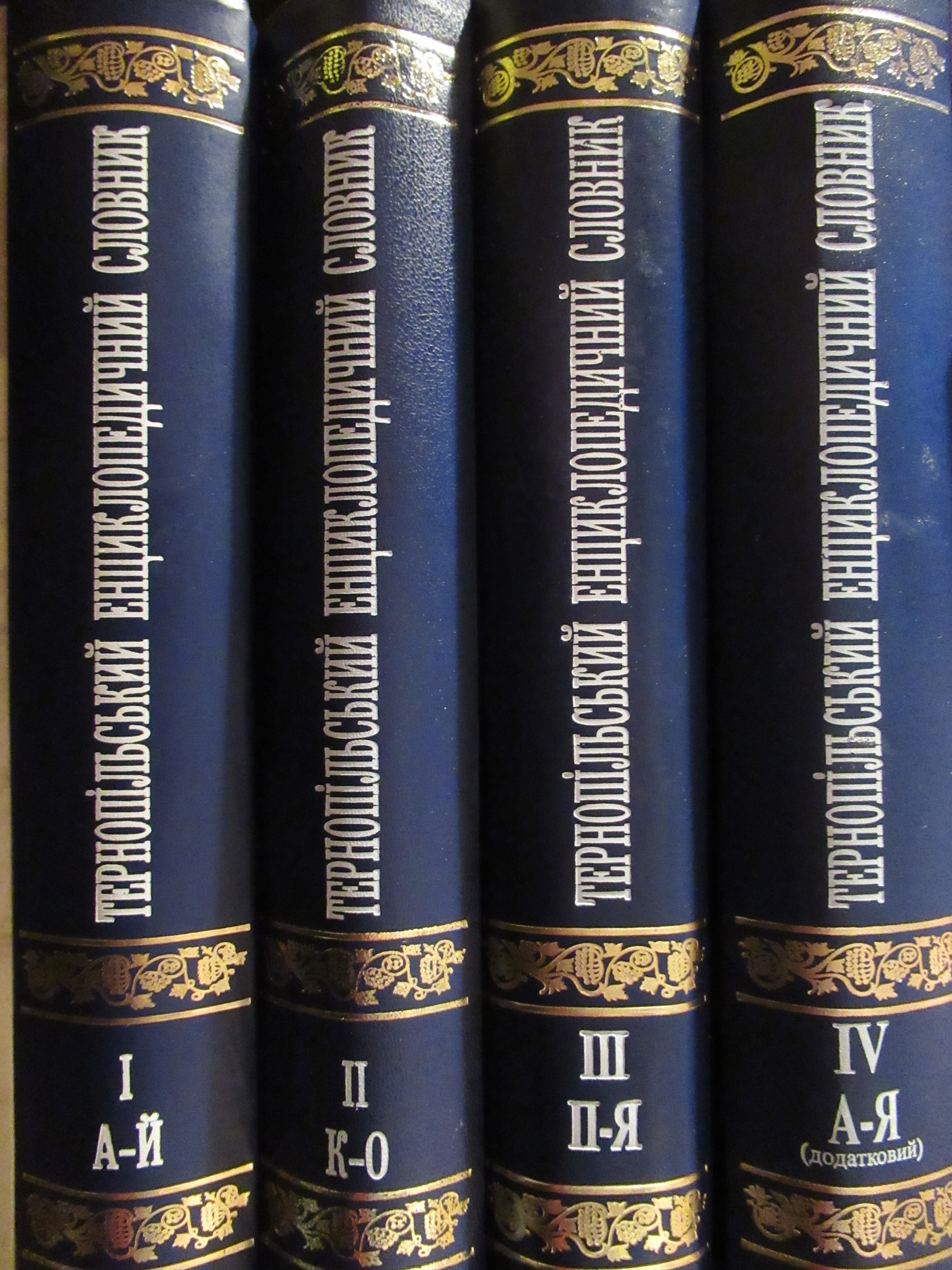

The Ternopil Encyclopedic Dictionary (Ukrainian: Тернопільський енциклопедичний словник) is a regional encyclopedia in Ukrainian containing information about the history, geography, culture, economy, administrative structure, and other features of Ternopil Oblast.

== Volumes ==
The encyclopedia has four volumes:

- Volume 1 (2004): А–Й, 696 pages
- Volume 2 (2005): К–О, 706 pages
- Volume 3 (2008): П–Я, 708 pages
- Volume 4 (2010): addenda, 788 pages

== Sources ==
- (in Ukrainian) Тернопільський енциклопедичний словник / редкол.: Г. Яворський та ін. — Тернопіль: видавничо-поліграфічний комбінат «Збруч», 2004–2010. — Т. 1–4.
